Claudianus may refer to:

People
 Marcus Livius Drusus Claudianus (fl. 1st century BC), a senator in Roman Republic and father of Livia, Roman empress and Augustus' third wife
 Claudianus (1st century), an Egyptian strategos of the nome, to whom was addressed in Papyrus Oxyrhynchus 51 (written in 173)
 Claudius Claudianus (c. 370 – c. 404), an Egypto-Roman poet born in Alexandria
 Claudianus Ecdidius Mamertus (died c. 473), a Gallo-Roman theologian and a brother of Saint Mamertus
 Osbern Pinnock of Gloucester or Claudianus Osbernus Pinnuc (1123–1200), an English Benedictine monk of St Peter's Abbey, Gloucester
 Claudianus Ostern, the pen name of the Slovak preacher Edmund Pascha (1714–1772)

Locations
 Mons Claudianus, a Roman quarry in the eastern desert of Egypt

Biology
 Hesperia claudianus (Latreille, [1824]), a synonym of Carystus phorcus, a butterfly species
 Carystus phorcus claudianus (Latreille, [1824]), a subspecies of Carystus phorcus
 Harma claudianus (Druce, 1874), a synonym of Euryphura chalcis, a butterfly species

Human name disambiguation pages